Legislative elections were held in Mexico on 4 July 1955. The Institutional Revolutionary Party won 153 of the 162 seats in the Chamber of Deputies.

Results

References

Mexico
Legislative
Legislative elections in Mexico
Election and referendum articles with incomplete results
July 1955 events in Mexico